is a dam in Tsunan, Niigata Prefecture, Japan, completed in 1971.

References 

Dams in Niigata Prefecture
Dams completed in 1971